Ismaël Kandouss (born 12 November 1997) is a professional footballer who plays as a defender for Belgian First Division A club Union SG. Born in France, he is a youth international for Morocco.

Playing career
After starting his career at Dunkerque, Kandouss joined Union Saint-Gilloise in January 2019. He made his professional debut with Saint-Gilloise in a 2-1 Belgian Second Division win over Leuven on 20 January 2019.

International career
Born in France, Kandouss is of Moroccan descent. He is a youth international for Morocco.

Career statistics

Club

References

External links
 

1997 births
Living people
Footballers from Lille
Moroccan footballers
Morocco youth international footballers
French footballers
French sportspeople of Moroccan descent
Association football defenders
Royale Union Saint-Gilloise players
USL Dunkerque players
Belgian Pro League players
Challenger Pro League players
Championnat National players
Championnat National 3 players
Moroccan expatriate footballers
Moroccan expatriates in Belgium
French expatriate footballers
French expatriates in Belgium
Expatriate footballers in Belgium